German submarine U-388 was a Type VIIC U-boat of Nazi Germany's Kriegsmarine during World War II.

The submarine was laid down on 12 September 1941 at the Howaldtswerke yard in Kiel, launched on 12 November 1942 and commissioned on 31 December 1942 under the command of Oberleutnant zur See Peter Sues.

Design
German Type VIIC submarines were preceded by the shorter Type VIIB submarines. U-388 had a displacement of  when at the surface and  while submerged. She had two shafts and two  propellers.

U-388 was fitted with five  torpedo tubes (four fitted at the bow and one at the stern), fourteen torpedoes, one  SK C/35 naval gun, 220 rounds, and two twin  C/30 anti-aircraft guns. The boat had a complement of between forty-four and sixty.

Service history
U-388 conducted her training as part of the 5th U-boat Flotilla, before being attached to the 9th U-boat Flotilla for front-line service on 1 June 1943.

U-388 sailed from Kiel on 8 June 1943 on her first patrol in the Atlantic. On 20 June, she was sunk south-east of Cape Farewell, Greenland, in position , by depth charges from a PBY Catalina aircraft of United States Navy Patrol Squadron VP-84, and was lost with all 47 men on board.

References

Bibliography

External links

German Type VIIC submarines
U-boats commissioned in 1942
U-boats sunk in 1943
U-boats sunk by depth charges
U-boats sunk by US aircraft
World War II submarines of Germany
World War II shipwrecks in the Atlantic Ocean
1942 ships
Ships built in Kiel
Ships lost with all hands
Maritime incidents in June 1943